Ardeşen District is a district of the Rize Province of Turkey. Its seat is the town of Ardeşen. Its area is 376 km2, and its population is 42,542 (2021).

Composition
There are two municipalities in Ardeşen District:
 Ardeşen
 Tunca

There are 41 villages in Ardeşen District:

 Akdere
 Akkaya
 Arıcılar
 Armağan
 Aşağıdurak
 Bayırcık
 Beyazkaya
 Çıraklar
 Deremezra
 Doğanay
 Duygulu
 Eskiarmutluk
 Gündoğan
 Güney
 Hoşdere
 Kaçkar
 Kirazlık
 Köprüköy
 Küçükköy
 Kurtuluş
 Manganez
 Önder
 Ortaalan
 Özgür
 Pınarlı
 Pirinçlik
 Serindere
 Seslikaya
 Sinanköy
 Şehitlik
 Şendere
 Şenyamaç
 Şenyurt
 Yamaçdere
 Yavuz
 Yeniköy
 Yeniyol
 Yeşiltepe
 Yukarıdurak
 Yurtsever
 Zeytinlik

References

Districts of Rize Province